Johanna "Hanni" Hölzner (February 17, 1913 – 1988) was a German breaststroke swimmer who competed in the 1936 Summer Olympics.

In 1936 she finished fourth in the 200 metre breaststroke event.

External links
Hanni Hölzner's profile at Sports Reference.com
Biography of Hanni Hölzner 

1913 births
1988 deaths
German female swimmers
Olympic swimmers of Germany
Swimmers at the 1936 Summer Olympics
European Aquatics Championships medalists in swimming
German female breaststroke swimmers
20th-century German women